Morton Armour Kaer (September 7, 1903 – January 11, 1992), nicknamed "Devil May," was an athlete in track   and an All-American collegiate and professional American football player. He was born in Omaha, Nebraska and died in Mount Shasta, California.

At the 1924 Summer Olympics in Paris, he placed fifth in the Olympic pentathlon competition.

He was a halfback for the USC Trojans from 1924 to 1926. In 1925, he set a school record by scoring 19 touchdowns, which led the nation that year, tying Peggy Flournoy's mark. The record lasted 43 years, broken in 1968 by O. J. Simpson. In Kaer's three years he had 36 touchdowns, a career record for the school, tied by Simpson in 1967 and 1968. He was elected All-American in 1926.

Five years after his college career, Kaer played one year of professional football, 1931, with the Frankford Yellow Jackets of the National Football League. He became coach at Weed High School in Weed, California, where he accumulated a record of 187–47–7 over 28 years in which his teams won 17 conference championships.

He was elected to the College Football Hall of Fame in 1972.

References

External links
 
 
 
 

1903 births
1992 deaths
American football halfbacks
American pentathletes
Frankford Yellow Jackets players
USC Trojans football players
High school football coaches in California
All-American college football players
College Football Hall of Fame inductees
Athletes (track and field) at the 1924 Summer Olympics
Olympic track and field athletes of the United States
Sportspeople from Omaha, Nebraska
People from Red Bluff, California
Players of American football from Nebraska